Leandro Morgalla (born 13 September 2004) is a German professional footballer who plays as a defender for 1860 Munich.

Club career
Having joined 1860 Munich's academy from SpVgg Unterhaching aged 10, he made his first team debut for the club as a substitute in a 1–0 3. Liga win over Viktoria Köln.

International career
Morgalla represents Germany at under-18 level.

References

External links

2004 births
Living people
German footballers
Association football defenders
TSV 1860 Munich players
TSV 1860 Munich II players
3. Liga players
Oberliga (football) players
Germany youth international footballers